, was a biweekly manga anthology published by Shueisha under the Jump line of magazines. Released in Japan on December 20, 1986, the magazine provided serialized chapters of various seinen manga series. The manga series were published under the Jump Comics Deluxe imprint.

History 

The magazine started as a special issue of Weekly Shōnen Jump (WJ) on December 20, 1986. It later got split into its own independent bi-monthly manga anthology. It was primarily drama manga and was intended for young adult males in their early years of college. Super Jump manga artists were normally Shōnen artists from Weekly Jump, or were supported by another shōnen magazine. Some Weekly Jump series moved with Super Jump's split, due to their higher age level (e.g. Cobra).

Very rarely Weekly Jump handed a series over to Weekly Young Jump. If it was, the manga had a much more mature audience. Shueisha (publisher of Super Jump and other Jump anthologies) was worried that if too many series were moved, the younger fans would have been exposed to older, mature series (also an issue with other major Japanese publishing companies). Titles like Business Jump, Ultra Jump, etc. were restricted from having Weekly Jump series moved into their anthologies.

On December 11, 1988, Super Jump made a special anthology; . The "Oh" in Oh Super Jump stands for "Otaku" (the name for an obsessive anime and manga fan). Some series from the offshoot have also been moved to the main magazine in 2007.

Super Jump published its last issue in late 2011. Three ongoing series were moved to a new title, Grand Jump.

Features

Oh Super Jump 
 was an offshoot of the leading magazine, Super Jump. Oh Super Jump started as a special issue of the main manga magazine Super Jump in January 2004. After 2004 the magazine became a monthly publication, with many serializations. Although the magazine became a monthly it still had many one-shots in addition to the main series. The "Oh" in Oh Super Jump stood for Otaku, a name for an established anime and manga fan.

Serializations

Former series

References

External links
  
 

1986 establishments in Japan
2011 disestablishments in Japan
Defunct magazines published in Japan
Magazines established in 1986
Magazines disestablished in 2011
Magazines published in Tokyo
Monthly manga magazines published in Japan
Shueisha magazines
Seinen manga magazines
Semimonthly manga magazines published in Japan